Maurice FitzGerald, Lord of Maynooth, Naas, and Llanstephan (born: almost certainly not at Windsor Castle, more likely Carew in Wales c.1105 – September c.1176 Wexford, Ireland.  He was a medieval Anglo-Norman baron and a major figure in the Norman Invasion of Ireland.

Wars in Wales and Ireland

A Welsh Marcher Lord, Lord Llanstephan had fought alongside his older brother William FitzGerald, and half-brother Robert FitzStephen, constable of Cardigan, under Robert FitzMartin at the Battle of Crug Mawr in Wales in 1136.

Llansteffan Castle overlooks the River Tywi estuary where it enters Carmarthen Bay. It was captured by Maredudd ap Gruffydd in 1146 against the forces of Maurice FitzGerald and his brother William, Lord of Emlyn who were the leading Norman settlers of the region.  The castle was retaken by the Normans in 1158.

Diarmait Mac Murchada (Dermot MacMurrough), the deposed King of Leinster who had been exiled by the High King of Ireland, sought Cambro-Norman assistance to regain his throne. Lord Llanstephan participated in the resulting 1169 Norman invasion of Ireland.  He assisted his younger half-brother Robert Fitz-Stephen in the Siege of Wexford (1169). His nephew Raymond was Strongbow's second-in-command and had the chief share both in the capture of Waterford and in the successful assault on Dublin in 1171. Lord Lanstephan and his son's the FitzMaurices also fought in this battle.

Marriage and issue
Maurice FitzGerald, Lord Llanstephan is known to have married Alice de Montgomery, a daughter of Arnulf de Montgomery. It has been asserted by eminent authorities that Arnulf left, by his wife, Lafracoth, a daughter, Alice, and that she was later the wife of Maurice FitzGerald, son of Gerald FitzWalter (Gerald of Windsor).  By Maurice, one of the first conquerors of Ireland, who died in 1176, she was the mother of Gerald (died 1205), who laid the fortunes of the FitzGeralds of Kildare.  (Even Curtis - referenced below - says he can't find a source for Alice and, on the whole, she seems a)unlikely to have existed and b)impossible for Maurice to have met.) Alice herself was living in 1171, and was then in Ireland with her husband and sons. Maurice FitzGerald, by his wife Alice, had the following children:

 Thomas FitzMaurice, Lord OConnello (d.1213)
 Gerald FitzMaurice, 1st Lord of Offaly (b.1150, d.1204)
  William FitzMaurice, 1st Lord of Naas (d.1199)
 Maurice FitzMaurice, 1st Lord of Kiltrany 
 Alexander FitzMaurice 
 Robert FitzMaurice  
 Nesta FitzMaurice (m.Hervey de Montmorenci, Constable of England)

Lord Llanstephan's second eldest son Gerald FitzMaurice, the 1st Lord of Offaly was the progenitor of the FitzGerald and FitzMaurice Earls of Kildare and Dukes of Leinster.

The original Earldom of Desmond in the province of Munster was based on landholdings belonging to the descendants of Maurice's eldest son Thomas FitzMaurice, Lord OConnello. Thomas's son John FitzMaurice FitzThomas, who was killed in the Battle of Callann, became the 1st Baron Desmond. Others from this line include the Knights of Glin and Knights of Kerry.

Ancestry
Maurice FitzGerald, Lord Llanstephan  was the second eldest son of Gerald FitzWalter known as Gerald de Windsor, Constable of Pembroke by his wife, Nest ferch Rhys, Princess of Deheubarth and a member of the Welsh royal House of Dinefwr.

References

Citations
.

.
.
.
.
 
. 

1100s births
1176 deaths
12th-century English nobility
12th-century Normans
Anglo-Normans
Normans in Ireland
Anglo-Normans in Wales
Norman warriors
People from Pembrokeshire
Maurice
12th-century Welsh people